George Bălăiță (17 April 1935 in Bacău – 16 April 2017 in Bucharest) was a Romanian novelist.

References

1935 births
2017 deaths
Burials at Bellu Cemetery
People from Bacău
Romanian novelists
Romanian male novelists
International Writing Program alumni